Deborah Petroz-Abeles (born Deborah Sharon Abeles; 20 December 1948 in Bulawayo, Southern Rhodesia, now Zimbabwe), known professionally as Dessa, is a Swiss artist.

Early life 
Dessa was born into a Jewish family in Southern Rhodesia, the daughter of a Polish mother and a Hungarian father, who completed his medical training in Italy. Her father established the first private medical practice in Bulawayo for Black Africans. As a young child, Dessa had instruction in ballet and piano, the latter playing a central role in her art. After matriculating she lived in Israel from 1965 to 1976, where she studied occupational therapy. In 1977 she moved to Paris and then to Switzerland in 1981, becoming a Swiss citizen in 1983.

Career 
Dessa grew up in a society determined by racial divisions. This experience is reflected in her art, which synthesizes associations and transcend borders. Her creative output reflects her cultural diversity, both in the choice of her subjects (through which she explores her identity), and the mediums and means of expression she utilizes. In her early period she explores the relationship between visual art and music. Many works from this period arose from meditations on specific works, complemented by musicological research, resulting in paintings in which the music guides her artistic expression. Composers whose music has inspired visual responses include Béla Bartók, Leonard Bernstein, Ernst Bloch, Benjamin Britten, Unsuk Chin, Detlev Glanert, Dominique Gesseney-Rappo, Erich Korngold, Gustav Mahler, Olivier Messiaen, René Oberson, and Nino Rota. The scope of her work has expanded since 2000, as her works take on a profound historical dimension, integrating copious research as well as rare archival materials.

Visual works in dialogue with music 
Dessa's art works are, in fact, dialogues expressed as paintings. They are dialogues that often resemble spiritual exercises. Because – if they are not in direct communication with a musician like today's improvisation – they require a lot of solitude, concentration and sacfrifice. With interlocutors such as Mahler, Schreker, Ullmann or Britten one simply cannot discuss. One has to love them, know them well, their ideas, their destiny, their tragedy. Without this, they do not open up to us.
The scope of her musical collaborators has enlarged to include living composers (Unsuk Chin und Detlev Glanert). Additionally she has collaborated on several "live-painting" concerts, e.g. Flying Colours  and Musiques et Pinceaux, 2008.

The music of Viktor Ullmann, specifically the last Piano Sonata No 7, brought to life the loss of her grandparents in Auschwitz concentration camp. Ullmann, who had been deported to the Theresienstadt concentration camp, composed his final works there, before he was deported to the camp at Auschwitz-Birkenau, where he was murdered on 18 October 1944. Her 1997 project "Ein Vermächtnis aus Theresienstadt" (A Legacy from Theresienstadt) was exhibited both in the Berliner Dom in 2000 as well as in Theresienstadt in 2002.
The music gives rhythm to the gesture and allows the color to unfold... Dessa seizes the canvas, sets in motion powerful waves that burst into foam with their disheveled splatters, ground-swells that tear the surface of their irresistible force... Her instinctive fervor and impetuous passion are the temperament of a true painter.

Visual works in response to the Shoah 

An accidental discovery in an antique store in Berlin in November 2000 of a unique album entitled Die Hygiene im Wandel der Zeiten (Hygiene Throughout the Ages) developed into her most ambitious project to date, a plethora of research resulting in a book as well as a new series of paintings as a tribute to the Kaufhaus Nathan Israel (Israel's Department Store), which existed from 1815 to 1939. The Kaufhaus N. Israel was not only for a time the largest department store in Berlin but also one of the largest retail establishments in Europe, employing over 2,000 people. The album that Dessa found was one in a series of fifteen annual publications that the Kaufhaus N. Israel published between 1900 and 1914.

Dessa created a series of paintings entitled "Stolzesteine", both as a tribute to N. Israel and as a reaction to the Stolperstein which she encountered in Berlin. In her view, the Stolperstein are a particularly problematical method of commemorating murdered Jews, nonetheleast because they are trampled on and dirtied. The artist is extremely critical of any "mass" project which collectively represents Holocaust victims by reducing their existence to a single symbol, as this method of portrayal invariably calls to mind the marking of Jews with the yellow star by the Nazis.
I looked up the word "Stolpersteine" in a dictionary and the next word underneath it, was "stolz" (proud) – it was an inspiration. During my research on the N. Israel firm, I learned they were proud that their firm stood right in the center of the town. I am proud too – to be a Jew, a woman, and from Africa. And so I developed the "Stones-of-Pride" as an alternative project to the stumbling stones.
By inserting a commemorative stone into her paintings, people "look up" to the person's life, thus honoring the memory of a person and their lifetime achievements, instead of "looking down" on them, as one does with a Stolperstein, which is set in the pavement. Dessa is very outspoken about the message that the Stolpersteine sends in contemporary society:

Ich fordere jeden Deutschen auf, sich zu überlegen, wie die Nazis der 30er-Jahre die Stolpersteine sehen würden. Meiner Meinung nach materialisiert dieses Projekt ihren größten Wunsch: Schaut, wie viele ermordete Juden es gab – das haben wir geschafft. (I challenge every German to reconsider, how the Nazis would react to seeing the Stolpersteine. In my opinion, the (Stolpersteine) project realises their final wish by proclaiming: look how many Jews we succeeded in murdering.)

In 2015, Dessa embarked on an ambitious project engaging with the legacy of Dr Alice Salomon, social reformer, educator, economist, feminist and peace activist, though her project titled « The Art of Remembrance: Alice Salomon". Salomon’s doctoral thesis expounded the inequality of wages between men and women, and she founded the Social School for Women in Berlin in 1908.  Salomon was exiled from Germany in 1937 on account of her Jewish origins and international peace activities. In addition to her own research and writings, Dessa used various techniques to engage the viewer with Alice Salomon’s intensive and extensive life: paintings, collages, objects, installations and an imaginary conversation form a thorough narrative. As in many of Dessa’s other works, several paintings (here four separate portraits) feature a commemorative stone which has been inserted into the painting.

Major exhibitions 
 1994: Galerie Bremer, Berlin – paintings based on Leonard Bernstein's Age of Anxiety
 1997: Galerie Lilian Andrée, Basel – A Legacy from Theresienstadt – paintings from Viktor Ullmann's Piano Sonata No 7
 1999: Galerie Bremer, Berlin – paintings based on Erich Korngold's Abschiedslieder
 2000: Musée de Pully, Schweiz – Dessa: Abstraction lyrique 1990–2000
 2004: Galerie Bremer, Berlin – collages and paintings A Tribute to Kaufhaus N. Israel 1815–1939
 2005: Jüdisches Museum Westfalen – A Tribute to Kaufhaus N. Israel, Berlin 1815–1939
 2006: Galerie Bremer, Berlin – Land Escapes
 2006: Musée de Pully, Schweiz – From Hygiene to Art
 2008: Musique et Pinceaux: Live-Painting, 5 collaborative concerts with the composer Dominique Gesseney-Rappo, conductor Blaise Heritier and the Flying Brass Orchestra. Film: Bernard Villat.
 2008: Concerts de Monbenon, Lausanne – 10-year anniversary of Ph+Arts magazine. Lala Isakova, piano. Video-projection of the series Ein Vermächtnis aus Theresienstadt
 2008: Foyer Amtsgericht, Stuttgart-Bad Cannstatt – Dessa: Land Escapes
 2008: Exhibition in the Judaicum Center, Krakow, Poland – 20th anniversary of the International Contemporary Music Festival Krakow – paintings inspired by the music of Olivier Messiaen and Viktor Ullmann
 2010: JayKay Gallery, Switzerland – Dessa: 2000–2010
 2011: Galerie Petra Lange, Berlin – Dessa Komposition
 2013: Galerie Petra Lange, Berlin: Do we smile or do we weep? Paintings based on the Four Sea Interludes and Passacaglia from Benjamin Britten's Peter Grimes. A Centenary Homage to Benjamin Britten, in collaboration with Boosey & Hawkes Music Publications
 2013: Shanghai Art Fair, represented by Galerie Steiner, Vienna
 2015: Espace culturel Assens – DESSA Peinture / Musique / Identité
 2015: Galerie Petra Lange, Berlin – DESSA – In the Darkness, the Light – in collaboration with the Mitte-Museum Berlin
 2015: Mitte Museum, Berlin – DESSA – Kaufhaus Nathan Israel 1815–1939 – Eine Künstlerin erforscht Geschichte
 2017: Fondation l’Estrée, Ropraz, Schweiz  – DESSA and VIKTOR ULLMANN
 2018: frauen museum wiesbaden – The Art of Remembrance: Alice Salomon 1872-1948
 2018: Ausstellungszentrum Pyramide Berlin – Kunst und Erinnern: Exhibition commemorating the anti-Semitic pogroms in November 1938 
 2022: Parliament of Berlin DESSA: The Art of Remembrance - Alice Salomon

Publications 
 A Legacy from Theresienstadt. Berlin 1997 
 A Tribute to Kaufhaus N. Israel. Berlin 2003 
 Composition (Music and Painting). Berlin 2010 
 Do we smile or do we weep? Paintings based on Benjamin Britten's Four Sea Interludes and Passacaglia from Peter Grimes. Berlin 2013 
 Stolzesteine – Stones of Pride. Berlin 2015 
 The Art of Remembrance: Alice Salomon Berlin 2018

See also
, database of French artists

References

External links 
 
 
 Swiss Institute for Art Research

Living people
Swiss artists
1948 births